Sowt (Arabic: صَوْت), Arabic for "voice", is an Arabic-language independent podcasting network based in Amman, Jordan. It was launched in 2017 by Hazem Zureiqat, Tarek Zureiqat, and Ramsey Tesdell. Sowt curates and produces podcasts on issues of political, social, and cultural nature. Among its most popular programmes are ‘Eib’, ‘Dom Tak’ and ‘Blank Maps’.

History 
Sowt started in the early 2010s as a social networking platform where users could share audio clips on a public feed. The application did not gain enough traction and in 2017, when former Nieman Lab contributor Ramsey Tesdell joined as managing partner, Sowt transformed into a podcasting network. Sowt produces its content with the support of grants from local and international organisations.

Programs 
Sowt currently produces the following shows, most of which are narrative-driven:

 Eib: Arabic for “shame”, a podcast that addresses social, cultural and religious taboos in Arab society such as divorce, homosexuality and sexual violence.
 Dom Tak: a narrative-driven podcast, produced in collaboration with Ma3azef, that explores the stories of unsung female singers in the Arab world.
 Masaha: a podcast offering women of various backgrounds the space to discuss their views on economic and social issues facing the region.
 Parliament: a regular podcast that facilitates a conversation between the public and the Jordanian House of Representatives.
 Razan: a narrative-podcast following the progress of the Syrian civil war through the kidnapping of lawyer and human rights activist Razan Zaitouneh.
Religion and State: a podcast exploring the relationship between state and religion in the Arab world from a philosophical and political lens.
Blank Maps: a podcast depicting stories of victims of statelessness across the Arab world.
Ya Rayeh: a podcast recounting stories of immigration attempts and experiences of citizens of Algeria, Lebanon, and Jordan.
Ma Alaml: a podcast interviewing foreign domestic workers in the Middle East discussing the discrimination and legal difficulties they face.
Ali Alkadri: a podcast discussing Ali Alkadri's theories and the region's development difficulties.
Visualizing Conflict: a short series produced in cooperation with the University of Copenhagen to highlight the importance of images in conflict zones.

References 

Companies of Jordan
Organisations based in Amman
Podcasting companies